Samuel Carlos Gitler Hammer (July 14, 1933 – September 9, 2014) was a Mexican mathematician. He was an expert in Yang–Mills theory and is known for the Brown–Gitler spectrum.

Born to a Jewish family in Mexico City, Gitler studied civil engineering at the National Autonomous University of Mexico, graduating in 1956. He then did his graduate studies in mathematics at Princeton University with Norman Steenrod, earning a doctorate in 1960. He taught briefly at Brandeis University and then returned to Mexico, where he was one of the founders of the mathematics department of CINVESTAV.

Gitler was president of the Mexican Mathematical Society from 1967 to 1969, and chair at CINVESTAV from 1973 to 1981. In the late 1980s he moved to the University of Rochester, where he chaired the mathematics department. After retiring from Rochester in 2000, he returned to CINVESTAV.

Gitler won Mexico's National Prize for Science in 1976. In 1986 he became a member of the Colegio Nacional. In 2012 he became a fellow of the American Mathematical Society.

Publications

References

External links
 

1933 births
2014 deaths
Mexican people of Jewish descent
Mexican mathematicians
20th-century Mexican mathematicians
National Autonomous University of Mexico alumni
Princeton University alumni
Brandeis University faculty
University of Rochester faculty
Mexican scientists
Fellows of the American Mathematical Society
People from Mexico City
Topologists